Chris Martinez is an American retired soccer defender who played professionally in the American Professional Soccer League, National Professional Soccer League and Major League Soccer.

Martinez graduated from Ponderosa High School in Parker, Colorado.  He attended Clemson University, where he played on the men's soccer team from 1989 to 1992.  In June 1993, he signed with the Colorado Foxes of the American Professional Soccer League and was part of the Foxes championship team.  He would play every season until called up to the Colorado Rapids in 1997.  In October 1994, he signed with the Wichita Wings of the National Professional Soccer League.  Martinez played two winter indoor seasons with the Wings.  In June 1997, the Rapids called Martinez up from the Foxes.  He remained with the Rapids through the 2001 season.

On 13 January 2022, Martinez joined Houston Dynamo as an assistant coach. After just 29 matches, he was fired on September 5.

References

External links
 

Living people
American soccer players
American Professional Soccer League players
Clemson Tigers men's soccer players
Colorado Foxes players
Colorado Rapids players
Major League Soccer players
National Professional Soccer League (1984–2001) players
Wichita Wings (NPSL) players
Soccer players from Colorado
MLS Pro-40 players
A-League (1995–2004) players
People from Parker, Colorado
Colorado Rapids non-playing staff
Association football defenders
1970 births
Sporting Kansas City II coaches
USL Championship coaches
Houston Dynamo FC non-playing staff